Nice & Smooth is the debut studio album by American hip-hop duo Nice & Smooth from The Bronx, NY. It was released on  May 16, 1989 via Fresh Records and Sleeping Bag Records. The album is notable for its sense of humor and comedy rhymes. The release singles of the album are "Early to Rise" and "Funky for You." This was the duo's only release on Fresh/Sleeping Bag Records before it signed with Def Jam Recordings sub-label RAL Records. It was included in The Source's 100 Best Rap Albums. It was one of three titles acquired by Priority Records when Sleeping Bag went out of business in 1992.

Track listing
 "Early to Rise"
 "Something I Can't Explain"
 "Perfect Harmony"
 "We are No. 1"
 "No Delayin'"
 "Funky for You"
 "Skill Trade"
 "More and More Hits"
 "O-o-h, Child"
 "Hit Me"
 "Gold"
 "Dope Not Hype"
 "Nice & Smooth"
 "Dope on a Rope"
 "Sum Pimped-out Shit"

Personnel
Peter Bodtke — Photography
D-Square — Engineer
DJ Teddy Tedd — Turntables
Nice & Smooth — Main Performer
Greg Nice — Producer, Mixing
Ivan “Doc” Rodriguez — Engineer
Smooth B. — Producer, Mixing
Howie Weinberg — Mastering

References

External links
 
 MP3.com summary
 All Of Nice And Smooth

Nice & Smooth albums
1989 debut albums
Fresh Records (US) albums
Priority Records albums